Allison Pass (el. ) is a highway summit along the Crowsnest Highway in British Columbia, Canada. It is the highest point on the highway between the cities of Hope and Princeton. The Skagit originates at the pass while the Similkameen originates just north of it.

Cyclists and motorists alike find this stretch of road difficult because of the steep grades and high altitudes.  On the way from Hope to Allison Pass, one must ascend the 7% (1 in 14) grades up to the Hope Slide before one can start up to Allison Pass, leaving many trucks waiting at the side of the road for their engines to cool down.

History 
The pass was named after John Fall Allison, a rancher living in Princeton.

References

External links
Current weather at Allison Pass

Mountain passes of British Columbia
Similkameen Country
Canadian Cascades
Mountain passes of the North Cascades